Marta E. Torres is a marine geologist known for her work on the geochemistry of cold seeps and methane hydrates. She is a professor at Oregon State University, and an elected fellow of the Geochemical Society and the Geological Society of America.

Education and career 
Torres has a B.S. from the Universidad de Costa Rica (1976), and an M.S. (1983) and a Ph.D. (1988) from Oregon State University. As of 2022 she is a professor at Oregon State University.

Research 
Torres is known for her work at cold seeps and gas hydrates, geochemical tracers used to track fluid flow in seep environments, and the chemistry of sediments and porewaters. Her early research examined the minerals associated with cold seeps near Peru, with a focus on barium-containing minerals. Her subsequent research has examined minerals in methane hydrates, methane venting from the seafloor, and barite formed at cold seeps. She has also examined the methane found in gas hydrates in the Arctic, and silicate weathering in anoxic sediments.

Selected publications

Awards and honors 
In 2013 Torres was named a fellow of the Geological Society of America and a fellow of Hanse-Wissenschaftskolleg. In 2021 Torres was named a fellow of the Geochemical Society.

References

External links 

Living people
University of Costa Rica alumni
Oregon State University alumni
Oregon State University faculty
Women oceanographers
Women geologists
Year of birth missing (living people)